Tata Digwadih Stadium is a sports stadium in Dhanbad, Jharkhand. The stadium is one of three cricket venues in the city besides Jealgora Stadium and Railway Stadium. The stadium has capacity of 10,000 person and has got day-night facilities to host matches.

The ground hosted a Women's One Day International match when India women's national cricket team played against West Indies women's cricket team in February 2004 as India won by 105 runs.

References

External links 
 Cricketarchive
 Cricinfo
 Wikimapia
 Dhanbad City 
 Dhanbad Portal

Dhanbad
Cricket grounds in Jharkhand
Sports venues in Jharkhand
Year of establishment missing